Nottingham Playhouse is a theatre in Nottingham, Nottinghamshire, England. It was first established as a repertory theatre in 1948 when it operated from a former cinema in Goldsmith Street.  Directors during this period included Val May and Frank Dunlop. The current building opened in 1963.

The building

The architect of the current theatre, constructed as an example of Modern architecture, was Peter Moro who had worked on the interior design of the Royal Festival Hall in London. When the theatre was completed, it was  controversial as it faces the gothic revival Roman Catholic cathedral designed by Augustus Pugin. However, the buildings received a Civic Trust Award in 1965. Despite the modern external appearance and the circular auditorium walls, the theatre has a proscenium layout, seating an audience of 770.

During the 1980s, when the concrete interiors were out of fashion, the Playhouse suffered from insensitive "refurbishment" that sought to hide its character. Since 1996, it has been a Grade II* listed building and in 2004, the theatre was sympathetically restored and refurbished with a grant from the Heritage Lottery Fund.

The sculpture Sky Mirror by Anish Kapoor was installed between the theatre and the adjacent green space of Wellington Circus in 2001 at a cost of £1.25m. It is one of the main features of the 160 seat Djanogly Terrace and in autumn 2007 won the Nottingham Pride of Place in a public vote to determine the city's favourite landmark.

In 2014–15, Nottingham Playhouse underwent a complete environmental upgrade including insulation of the fly tower, secondary and double glazing and installing PV panels.  The works were jointly funded by Arts Council England, Nottingham City Council, patron donations and philanthropist Sir Harry Djanogly. The award-winning works have been calculated to cut annual energy usage by over 35%.

In 2019, Nottingham Playhouse was named The Stage Regional Theatre of the Year.

Performance history

The new theatre's artistic direction was shared between Frank Dunlop and actor John Neville with Peter Ustinov as associate.

The first production in the new theatre was Shakespeare's Coriolanus in a production by Tyrone Guthrie. This included a young Ian McKellen as Tullus Aufidius opposite Neville in the title role.

Subsequent artistic directors were Stuart Burge, Richard Eyre, Geoffrey Reeves, Richard Digby Day, Kenneth Alan Taylor, Pip Broughton, Martin Duncan and Giles Croft. The Playhouse is currently under the leadership of Stephanie Sirr MBE, Chief Executive and Adam Penford, artistic director.

Nottingham Playhouse has a strong tradition of new works for children, both in the form of original writing and more recently in the form of classic pantomimes conceived by former artistic director Kenneth Alan Taylor.

In common with most producing theatres, Nottingham Playhouse no longer has a repertory approach to programming although it continues to create up to 13 new productions per annum. Its recent successes  include Old Big 'Ead in the Spirit of the Man, a homage to Nottingham legend Brian Clough, Rat Pack Confidential and Summer and Smoke, which both transferred to the West End and The Burial at Thebes which was part of the Barbican BITE season of autumn 2007 and toured the US in 2008.  Its production of Oedipus. created by Steven Berkoff. toured to the Spoleto Festival and stage adaptation of On the Waterfront to the West End for an extended run.

In 2013, an adaptation of The Kite Runner by Matthew Spangler produced by Nottingham Playhouse became the theatre's best selling ever drama up to that point in time. Autumn 2014 saw a successful UK tour of the piece and summer 2022 a Broadway revival at the Helen Haynes Theatre, again directed by Giles Croft.

In 2014, 2015 and 2016 the Nottingham Playhouse and Headlong Theatre production of 1984 played at the Playhouse Theatre in London's West End to positive reviews. In Autumn 2015' it toured to Australia and the USA.  In 2016' it was announced that the award-winning Nottingham Playhouse production of The Kite Runner would transfer to the West End from December 2016 to March 2017. The run was subsequently extended to the Playhouse Theatre in summer 2017 prior to a second UK tour.

In 2013, the theatre was awarded £1m from Arts Council England to undertake upgrading of the theatre's energy efficiency. Fiona Buffini's 'Mass Bolero marked 2014 - a tribute to Nottingham born Jayne Torvill and Christopher Dean's gold medal-winning performance at the 1984 winter olympics in Sarajevo by the people of Nottingham.  Over 800 Nottingham residents took part and the work has currently been viewed almost 80,000 times on YouTube.

In 2017 Touched by Nottingham writer Stephen Lowe and starring Nottingham-born actress Vicky McClure became the Playhouse's then best-selling ever drama.

The highlight of its 70th anniversary 2018 season was The Madness of George III by Alan Bennett starring Mark Gatiss, Debra Gillett and Adrian Scarborough which achieved record-breaking box office figures and was seen by around 500,000 people internationally through NTLive.

In 2020-21 the theatre presented a range of live and digital productions including the world premiere of James Graham’s new play, inspired by the pandemic, Bubble.  Autumn 2021 saw the world premiere of Mark Gatiss’s adaptation of A Christmas Carol: A Ghost Story before a London transfer to the Alexandra Palace. A filmed version was released in cinemas in 2022.

Participation and education

Through its Theatre In education (TIE) company Roundabout and, since 2004, in its own name Nottingham Playhouse has toured professional theatre in schools across the East Midlands.  It's TIE work has also toured internationally.  It now runs classes and courses for all ages and includes a programme for people at risk of homelessness, learning disabled adults and runs ten youth theatres free of charge in the community.

Awards

The Stage Regional Theatre of The Year 2019

What's On Stage Best Revival The Madness of George III 2018

What's on Stage Best Supporting actor Adrian Scarborough The Madness of George III 2018

UK Theatre Best Performance in a Musical Rebecca Trehearn Sweet Charity 2019.

UK Theatre Best Design Morgan Large, Wonderland 2018

References

Mass Bolero
https://www.youtube.com/watch?v=8WOO6qoEcgo

External links
Official Site
Productions, an incomplete listing on Theatricalia.

Grade II* listed buildings in Nottinghamshire
Theatres in Nottingham
Theatres completed in 1963
Producing theatres in England
Recipients of Civic Trust Awards